Robert Thomas Christgau (born April 18, 1942) is an American music journalist and essayist. Among the most well-known and influential music critics, he began his career in the late 1960s as one of the earliest professional rock critics and later became an early proponent of musical movements such as hip hop, riot grrrl, and the import of African popular music in the West. Christgau spent 37 years as the chief music critic and senior editor for The Village Voice, during which time he created and oversaw the annual Pazz & Jop critics poll. He has also covered popular music for Esquire, Creem, Newsday, Playboy, Rolling Stone, Billboard, NPR, Blender, and MSN Music, and was a visiting arts teacher at New York University. CNN senior writer Jamie Allen has called Christgau "the E. F. Hutton of the music world – when he talks, people listen."

Christgau is best known for his terse, letter-graded capsule album reviews, composed in a concentrated, fragmented prose style featuring layered clauses, caustic wit, one-liner jokes, political digressions, and allusions ranging from common knowledge to the esoteric. Originally published in his "Consumer Guide" columns during his tenure at The Village Voice from 1969 to 2006, the reviews were collected in book form across three decade-ending volumes – Christgau's Record Guide: Rock Albums of the Seventies (1981), Christgau's Record Guide: The '80s (1990), and Christgau's Consumer Guide: Albums of the '90s (2000). Multiple collections of his essays have also been published in book form, and a website published in his name since 2001 has freely hosted most of his work.

In 2006, the Voice dismissed Christgau after the paper's acquisition by New Times Media. He continued to write reviews in the "Consumer Guide" format for MSN Music, Cuepoint, and Noisey – Vices music section – where they were published in his "Expert Witness" column until July 2019. In September that year, he launched a paid-subscription newsletter called And It Don't Stop, published on the email-newsletter platform Substack and featuring a monthly "Consumer Guide" column, among other writings.

Early life
Christgau was born in Greenwich Village, Manhattan, New York City, on April 18, 1942, and was raised in Queens, the son of a fireman. He has said he became a rock and roll fan when disc jockey Alan Freed moved to the city in 1954.

After attending public school in New York City, he attended Dartmouth College, graduating in 1962 with a B.A. in English. At college, his musical interests turned to jazz, but he quickly returned to rock after moving back to New York. Christgau has said that Miles Davis's 1960 album Sketches of Spain initiated in him "one phase of the disillusionment with jazz that resulted in my return to rock and roll." He was deeply influenced by New Journalism writers such as Gay Talese and Tom Wolfe. "My ambitions when I went into journalism were always, to an extent, literary," Christgau later said.

Career

Christgau wrote short stories, before giving up fiction in 1964 to become a sportswriter, and later, a police reporter for the Newark Star-Ledger. He became a freelance writer after a story he wrote about the death of a woman in New Jersey was published by New York magazine. Christgau was among the first dedicated rock critics. He was asked to take over the dormant music column at Esquire, which he began writing in June 1967. He also contributed to Cheetah magazine at that time. He subsequently became a leading voice in the formation of a musical–political aesthetic combining New Left politics and the counterculture. After Esquire discontinued the column, Christgau moved to The Village Voice in 1969, and he also worked as a college professor.

From early on in his emergence as a critic, Christgau was conscious of his lack of formal knowledge of music. In a 1968 piece he commented:

I don't know anything about music, which ought to be a damaging admission but isn't ... The fact is that pop writers in general shy away from such arcana as key signature and beats to the measure ... I used to confide my worries about this to friends in the record industry, who reassured me. They didn't know anything about music either. The technical stuff didn't matter, I was told. You just gotta dig it.

In early 1972, Christgau accepted a full-time job as music critic for Newsday. He returned to The Village Voice in 1974 as music editor. In a 1976 piece for the newspaper, he coined the term "Rock Critic Establishment" to describe the growth in influence of American music critics. His article carried the parenthesized subtitle "But Is That Bad for Rock?" He listed Dave Marsh, John Rockwell, Paul Nelson, Jon Landau and himself as members of this "Establishment".

Christgau remained at The Village Voice until August 2006, when he was fired shortly after the paper's acquisition by New Times Media. Two months later, Christgau became a contributing editor at Rolling Stone (which first published his review of Moby Grape's Wow in 1968).  Late in 2007, Christgau was fired by Rolling Stone, although he continued to work for the magazine for another three months. Starting with the March 2008 issue, he joined Blender, where he was listed as "senior critic" for three issues and then "contributing editor". Christgau had been a regular contributor to Blender before he joined Rolling Stone. He continued to write for Blender until the magazine ceased publication in March 2009.

In 1987, he was awarded a Guggenheim Fellowship in the field of "Folklore and Popular Culture" to study the history of popular music.

Christgau has also written frequently for Playboy, Spin, and Creem.  He appears in the 2011 rockumentary Color Me Obsessed, about the Replacements.

He previously taught during the formative years of the California Institute of the Arts. As of 2007, he was also an adjunct professor in the Clive Davis Department of Recorded Music at New York University.

In August 2013, Christgau revealed in an article written for Barnes & Noble's website that he is writing a memoir. On July 15, 2014, Christgau debuted a monthly column on Billboards website.

"Consumer Guide" and "Expert Witness" columns

Christgau is perhaps best known for his "Consumer Guide" columns, which have been published more-or-less monthly since July 10, 1969, in the Village Voice, as well as a brief period in Creem. In its original format, each edition of the "Consumer Guide" consisted of approximately 20 single-paragraph album reviews, each given a letter grade ranging from A+ to E−. These reviews were later collected, expanded, and extensively revised in a three-volume book series, the first of which was published in 1981 as Christgau's Record Guide: Rock Albums of the Seventies; it was followed by Christgau's Record Guide: The '80s (1990) and Christgau's Consumer Guide: Albums of the '90s (2000).

In his original grading system from 1969 to 1990, albums were given a grade ranging from A+ to E−. Under this system, Christgau generally considered a B+ or higher to be a personal recommendation. He noted that in practice, grades below a C− were rare. In 1990, Christgau changed the format of the "Consumer Guide" to focus more on the albums he liked. B+ records that Christgau deemed "unworthy of a full review" were mostly given brief comments and star marks ranging from three down to one, denoting an honorable mention", records which Christgau believed may be of interest to their own target audience. Lesser albums were filed under categories such as "Neither" (which may impress at first with "coherent craft or an arresting track or two", before failing to make an impression again) and "Duds" (which indicated bad records and were listed without further comment). Christgau did give full reviews and traditional grades to records he pans in an annual November "Turkey Shoot" column in The Village Voice, until he left the newspaper in 2006.

In 2001, robertchristgau.com – an online archive of Christgau's "Consumer Guide" reviews and other writings from his career – was set up as a co-operative project between Christgau and longtime friend Tom Hull; the two had met in 1975 shortly after Hull queried Christgau as The Village Voices regional editor for St. Louis. The website was created after the September 11, 2001, attacks when Hull was stuck in New York while visiting from his native Wichita. While Christgau spent many nights preparing past Village Voice writings for the website, by 2002 much of the older "Consumer Guide" columns had been inputted by Hull and a small coterie of fans. According to Christgau, Hull is "a computer genius as well as an excellent and very knowledgeable music critic, but he'd never done much web site work. The design of the web site, especially its high searchability and small interest in graphics, are his idea of what a useful music site should be".

In December 2006, Christgau began writing his "Consumer Guide" columns for MSN Music, initially appearing every other month, before switching to a monthly schedule in June 2007. On July 1, 2010, he announced in the introduction to his "Consumer Guide" column that the July 2010 installment would be his last on MSN. However, on November 22, Christgau launched a blog on MSN, called "Expert Witness", which featured reviews only of albums that he had graded B+ or higher, since those albums "are the gut and backbone of my musical pleasure"; the writing of reviews for which are "so rewarding psychologically that I'm happy to do it at blogger's rates". He also began corresponding with dedicated readers of the column, named as "The Witnesses" after the column. On September 20, 2013, Christgau announced in the comments section that "Expert Witness" would cease to be published by October 1, 2013, writing, "As I understand it, Microsoft is shutting down the entire MSN freelance arts operation at that time ..."

On September 10, 2014, Christgau debuted a new version of "Expert Witness" on Cuepoint, an online music magazine published on the blogging platform Medium. In August 2015, he was hired by Vice to write the column for the magazine's music section, Noisey. In July 2019, the final edition of "Expert Witness" was published.

In September 2019, at the encouragement of friend and colleague Joe Levy, Christgau began publishing the newsletter "And It Don't Stop" on the newsletter-subscription platform Substack. Charging subscribers $5 per month, it has included his monthly "Consumer Guide" column, podcasts, and free weekly content like book reviews. Christgau was skeptical of the platform at first: "Basically I told Joe that if I didn't have enough subscribers to pay what I made at Noisey by Christmas I was going to quit. I wasn't going to do it for less than that money. I had that many subscribers inside of three days." By May 2020, "And It Don't Stop" had more than 1,000 subscribers. Christgau was ambivalent about the platform at first, but has since found it "immensely gratifying", explaining that, "A man my age, who is still really intellectually active? It is tremendously flattering and gratifying that there are people who are ready to help support me."

Pazz & Jop

Between 1968 and 1970, Christgau submitted ballots in Jazz & Pop magazine's annual critics' poll. He selected Bob Dylan's John Wesley Harding (released late in 1967), The Who's Tommy (1969), and Randy Newman's 12 Songs (1970) as the best pop albums of their respective years, and Miles Davis's Bitches Brew (1970) as the best jazz album of its year. Jazz & Pop discontinued publication in 1971.

In 1971, Christgau inaugurated the annual Pazz & Jop music poll, named in tribute to Jazz & Pop. The poll surveyed music critics on their favorite releases of the year. The poll results were published in the Village Voice every February after compiling "top ten" lists submitted by music critics across the nation. Throughout Christgau's career at the Voice, every poll was accompanied by a lengthy Christgau essay analyzing the results and pondering the year's overall musical output. The Voice continued the feature after Christgau's dismissal. Although he no longer oversaw the poll, Christgau continued to vote and, since the 2015 poll, also contributed essays to the results.

"Dean's Lists"
Each year that Pazz & Jop has run, Christgau has created a personal list of his favorite releases called the "Dean's List". Only his top ten count toward his vote in the poll, but his full lists of favorites usually numbered far more than that. These lists – or at least Christgau's top tens – were typically published in The Village Voice along with the Pazz & Jop results. After Christgau was dismissed from the Voice, he continued publishing his annual lists on his own website and at The Barnes & Noble Review.

While Pazz & Jop's aggregate critics' poll are its main draw, Christgau's Deans' Lists are noteworthy in their own right. Henry Hauser from Consequence of Sound said Christgau's "annual 'Pazz & Jop' poll has been a bona fide American institution. For music writers, his year-end essays and extensive 'Dean's List' are like watching the big ball drop in Times Square."

The following are Christgau's choices for the number-one album of the year, including the point score he assigned for the poll. Pazz & Jop's rules provided that each item in a top ten could be allotted between 5 and 30 points, with all ten items totaling 100, allowing critics to weight certain albums more heavily if they chose to do so. In some years, Christgau often gave an equal number of points to his first- and second-ranked albums, but they were nevertheless ranked as first and second, not as a tie for first; this list collects only his number-one picks.

Style and impact

"Christgau's blurbs", writes Slate music critic Jody Rosen, "are like no one else's – dense with ideas and allusions, first-person confessions and invective, highbrow references and slang". Rosen describes Christgau's writing as "often maddening, always thought-provoking ... With Pauline Kael, Christgau is arguably one of the two most important American mass-culture critics of the second half of the 20th century. ... All rock critics working today, at least the ones who want to do more than rewrite PR copy, are in some sense Christgauians." Spin magazine wrote in 2015, "You probably wouldn't be reading this publication if Robert Christgau didn't largely invent rock criticism as we know it."

Douglas Wolk said the earliest "Consumer Guide" columns were generally brief and detailed, but "within a few years ... he developed his particular gift for 'power, wit and economy', a phrase he used to describe the Ramones in a dead-on 37-word review of Leave Home". In his opinion, the "Consumer Guide" reviews were "an enormous pleasure to read slowly, as writing, even if you have no particular interest in pop music. And if you do happen to have more than a little interest in pop music, they're a treasure." While regarding the early columns as "a model of cogent, witty criticism", Dave Marsh in 1976 said "the tone of the writing is now snotty – it lacks compassion, not to mention empathy, with current rock."

Fans of Christgau's "Consumer Guide" like to share lines from their favorite reviews, Wolk writes, citing "Sting wears his sexual resentment on his chord changes like a closet 'American Woman' fan" (from Christgau's review of the 1983 Police album Synchronicity); "Calling Neil Tennant a bored wimp is like accusing Jackson Pollock of making a mess" (reviewing the 1987 Pet Shop Boys album Actually); and "Mick Jagger should fold up his penis and go home" (in a review of Prince's 1980 album Dirty Mind).

In 1978, Lou Reed recorded a tirade against Christgau and his column on the 1978 live album, Take No Prisoners: "Critics. What does Robert Christgau do in bed? I mean, is he a toe fucker? Man, anal retentive, A Consumer's Guide to Rock, what a moron: 'A Study' by, y'know, Robert Christgau. Nice little boxes: B-PLUS. Can you imagine working for a fucking year, and you get a B+ from some asshole in The Village Voice?" Christgau rated the album C+ and wrote in his review, "I thank Lou for pronouncing my name right." In December 1980, Christgau provoked angry responses from Voice readers when his column approvingly quoted his wife Carola Dibbell's reaction to the murder of John Lennon: "Why is it always Bobby Kennedy or John Lennon? Why isn't it Richard Nixon or Paul McCartney?" Similar criticism came from Sonic Youth in their song "Kill Yr Idols". Christgau responded by saying "Idolization is for rock stars, even rock stars manqué like these impotent bohos – critics just want a little respect. So if it's not too hypersensitive of me, I wasn't flattered to hear my name pronounced right, not on this particular title track."

Tastes and prejudices 
Christgau has named Louis Armstrong, Thelonious Monk, Chuck Berry, the Beatles, and the New York Dolls as his top five artists of all time. In a 1998 obituary, he called Frank Sinatra "the greatest singer of the 20th century". He considers Billie Holiday "probably  favorite singer". In his 2000 Consumer Guide book, Christgau said his favorite rock album was either The Clash (1977) or New York Dolls (1973), while his favorite record in general was Monk's 1958 Misterioso. In July 2013, during an interview with Esquire magazine's Peter Gerstenzang, Christgau criticized the voters at the Rock and Roll Hall of Fame, saying "they're pretty stupid" for not voting in the New York Dolls. When asked about Beatles albums, he said he most often listens to The Beatles' Second Album – which he purchased in 1965 – and Sgt. Pepper's Lonely Hearts Club Band.

Wolk wrote: "When he says he's 'encyclopedic' about popular music, he means it. There are not a lot of white guys in their 60s waving the flag for Lil Wayne's Da Drought 3, especially not in the same column as they wave the flag for a Willie Nelson/Merle Haggard/Ray Price trio album, an anthology of new Chinese pop, Vampire Weekend, and Wussy ..." Christgau reflected in 2004: "Rock criticism was certainly more fun in the old days, no matter how cool the tyros opining for chump change in netzines like PopMatters and Pitchfork think it is now."

Christgau readily admits to having prejudices and generally disliking genres such as heavy metal, salsa, dance, art rock, progressive rock, bluegrass, gospel, Irish folk, jazz fusion, and classical music. "I admire metal's integrity, brutality, and obsessiveness", Christgau wrote in 1986, "but I can't stand its delusions of grandeur, the way it apes and misapprehends reactionary notions of nobility". Christgau said in 2018 that he rarely writes about jazz as it is "hard" to write about in an "impressionistic way", that he is "not at all well-schooled in the jazz albums of the '50s and '60s", and that he has neither the "language nor the frame of reference to write readily about them"; even while critiquing jazz artists like Miles Davis, Ornette Coleman, and Sonny Rollins, he said "finding the words involves either considerable effort or a stroke of luck". Christgau has also admitted to disliking the records of Jeff Buckley and Nina Simone, noting that the latter's classical background, "default gravity and depressive tendencies are qualities I'm seldom attracted to in any kind of art." Writing in a two-part feature on music critics for Rolling Stone in 1976, Dave Marsh bemoaned Christgau as a "classic, sad example" of how "many critics ... superimpos[ed] their own, frequently arbitrary, standards upon performers." Marsh went on to accuse him of becoming "arrogant and humorless – the raves are reserved for jazz artists, while even the best rock is treated condescendingly unless it conforms to Christgau's passion for leftist politics (particularly feminism) and bohemian culture." Marsh named another prejudice of Christgau's to be "apolitical or middle-class performers" of rock music.

"Dean of American rock critics" 
Christgau has been widely known as the "Dean of American rock critics", a designation he originally gave to himself while slightly drunk at a press event for the 5th Dimension in the early 1970s. According to Rosen, "Christgau was in his late 20s at the time – not exactly an éminence grise – so maybe it was the booze talking, or maybe he was just a very arrogant young man. In any case, as the years passed, the quip became a fact." When asked about it years later, Christgau said the title "seemed to push people's buttons, so I stuck with it. There's obviously no official hierarchy within rock criticism – only real academies can do that. But if you mean to ask whether I think some rock critics are better than others, you're damn straight I do. Don't you?" "For a long time he's been called the 'dean of American rock critics'", wrote New York Times literary critic Dwight Garner in 2015. "It's a line that started out as an offhanded joke. These days, few dispute it."

Personal life
Christgau married fellow critic and writer Carola Dibbell in 1974; they have an adopted daughter, Nina, born in Honduras in 1986. He has said he was raised in a "born-again Church" in Queens, but has since become an atheist.

Christgau has been long, albeit argumentative, friends with critics such as Tom Hull, Dave Marsh, Greil Marcus, and the late Ellen Willis, whom he dated from 1966 to 1969. He has also mentored younger critics such as Ann Powers and Chuck Eddy.

Books 
 Any Old Way You Choose It: Rock and Other Pop Music, 1967–1973, Penguin Books, 1973
 Christgau's Record Guide: Rock Albums of the Seventies, Ticknor & Fields, 1981
 Christgau's Record Guide: The '80s, Pantheon Books, 1990
 Grown Up All Wrong: 75 Great Rock and Pop Artists from Vaudeville to Techno, Harvard University Press, 1998
 Christgau's Consumer Guide: Albums of the '90s, St. Martin's Griffin, 2000
 Going into the City: Portrait of a Critic as a Young Man, Dey Street Books, 2015
 Is It Still Good to Ya? Fifty Years of Rock Criticism 1967–2017, Duke University Press, 2018
 Book Reports: A Music Critic on His First Love, Which Was Reading, Duke University Press, 2019

See also 
 Album era

Notes

References

Citations

General bibliography

Further reading

External links

 Official website
 Users' Guide to the Consumer Guide at MSN Music

1942 births
20th-century American male writers
20th-century American non-fiction writers
21st-century American male writers
21st-century American non-fiction writers
American atheists
American essayists
American former Christians
American male essayists
American memoirists
American music critics
American music journalists
American short story writers
Dartmouth College alumni
Flushing High School alumni
Living people
New York University faculty
People from Greenwich Village
Rock critics
Rolling Stone people
Sportswriters from New York (state)
The Village Voice people
Vice Media
Writers from Manhattan
Writers from Queens, New York